Charles E. Bartley was an American scientist, known for developing the first elastomeric solid rocket propellant formula, at the Jet Propulsion Laboratory (JPL), now part of NASA, in Pasadena, California, in the late 1940s.

Bartley founded Grand Central Rocket Company in Redlands, California in 1952.  Six years later, his company provided the fuel for the third stage of Explorer 1, America's first satellite. Bartley eventually sold Grand Central and founded two other solid propellant rocket companies specializing in weather rockets and ejection seats for jets: Rocket Power, which he formed in Mesa, Arizona, in 1959, and Universal Propulsion Co., which he established in Phœnix in 1963. He was elected to the American Rocket Society (now the American Institute of Aeronautics and Astronautics) in 1951. In 1953, he was given a society award for outstanding contributions.

John Bluth interviewed Bartley over the course of two days in 1994 for the JPL archives.

References

1921 births
1996 deaths
Members of the American Rocket Society
Rocket scientists